Discordia is the Latin name of Eris, the Greek goddess of strife. 

It may also refer to:

Music
 Discordia (album), a death-metal album by Misery Index
 Discordia (band), an industrial-music band from Melbourne, Australia
 "Discordia" (song), a single by Todd La Torre and Glen Drover
 All Hail Discordia, an album by Canadian indie-rock band By Divine Right

Other uses
Discordianism, a modern religion centered on the idea that chaos is as important as order
Apocrypha Discordia, a collection of various works on Discordianism, compiled by Rev. Dr Jon Swabey
Discordian works, a collection of religious texts that include Principia Discordia and The Illuminatus Trilogy
Principia Discordia, a religious text written by Greg Hill and Kerry Thornley
 Discordia (moth), a genus of moths
 Discordia (film), a 2004 documentary film
 Discordia (game), a 2009 online game set in The Dark Tower universe
Illa de la Discòrdia (aka "Discordia block"), a district of Barcelona, Spain

See also
 
 
 Discord (disambiguation)